Albert L. Benson (born July 27, 1914) was an American professional basketball player. He played in the National Basketball League for the Hammond Ciesar All-Americans and Detroit Eagles in 1940–41 and averaged 1.6 points per game.

Early life
Benson was born in Hoboken, New Jersey on July 24, 1914. He served in the U.S. Army during the World War II era and was discharged in March 1946.

References

1914 births
Possibly living people
American Basketball League (1925–1955) players
American men's basketball players
Baltimore Bullets (1944–1954) players
Basketball players from New Jersey
Centers (basketball)
Detroit Eagles players
Hammond Ciesar All-Americans players
Paterson Crescents players
United States Army soldiers
United States Army personnel of World War II